Prosopocera callypiga is a species of beetle in the family Cerambycidae. It was described by Thomson in 1857, originally under the genus Ceroplesis. It is known from Tanzania, and possibly South Africa.

References

Prosopocerini
Beetles described in 1857